Alaska is a populated place in Cibola County, New Mexico, United States. It is located two miles west of Acomita Lake. Alaska was formerly a railroad station. It first appeared on the map in 1905.

See also
Acomita Lake, New Mexico
North Acomita Village, New Mexico
Skyline-Ganipa, New Mexico

References

Geography of Cibola County, New Mexico